Rue Monsieur-le-Prince is a street of Paris, located in the 6th arrondissement. It is named after the Prince of Condé, whose palace bordered it. From 1793 to 1805 the street was called Rue de la Liberté.

The street features in the title of the weird tale No. 252 Rue M. le Prince by the US architect Ralph Adams Cram.

See also
 Hôtel de Condé, formerly in the area, the Paris residence and estate of the princes of Condé from 1612 to 1770
 Maison d'Auguste Comte, a museum located at #10
 Polidor, a restaurant at #41
 Société des poètes français, a cultural foundation at #16
 Wall of Philip II Augustus, traces of which are visible in this street
Wilbur Winfield Woodward, the american painter lived and had a studio at # 22

References

External links

 

Monsieur-le-Prince